Delclosia is an extinct genus of shrimp in the order Decapoda, containing two species.

References

Atyidae
Early Cretaceous crustaceans
Fossils of Spain
Prehistoric crustacean genera
Cretaceous Spain
Fossil taxa described in 1993
Early Cretaceous arthropods of Europe